Baldassarre Bonifacio (5 January 1585 – 17 November 1659) was an Italian Catholic bishop, theologian, scholar and historian, known for his work  (1632), the first known treatise on the management of archives.

Biography 
The son of a lawyer of the same name, Bonifacio was born at Crema, in the Republic of Venice, on 5 January 1585. In his thirtieth year he went to study at Padua, and made such proficiency as to be created doctor of laws at the age of eighteen. About two years after he was appointed law professor in the college of Rovigo, where he first lectured on the Institutes of Justinian.

He afterwards accompanied Count Girolamo di Porzia, bishop of Adria and papal nuncio, to Germany as his private secretary, and was himself employed in some affairs of importance. On his return to Venice, he had several preferments, and among others that of archpriest of Rovigo. On 3 October 1619, he was elected Greek and Latin professor at Padua, but declined accepting the office.

In 1620, he assisted at Venice, in the establishment of an academy for the education of the young nobility and gave lectures on the civil law. Pope Urban VIII bestowed on him the archdeaconry of Treviso, which he held, with the office of grand vicar of that diocese, under four successive bishops. He assisted also very essentially in founding a new academy at Padua for the Venetian nobility, in 1636, and was the first director or president of it, and founded a similar establishment at Treviso.

In 1653 he was appointed bishop of Koper, which he held until his death in 1659. He was a man of various learning, as appears by his Historia Ludicra (1656) 4º, a collection of singular narratives from authors of every description. He published also some Latin poems in 1619, 12mo and De Romanæ Historiae Scriptoribus excerpta ex Bodino Vossio et aliis, Venice, 1627, 4º.

Throughout his life Bonifacio maintained many friendly relationships with numerous intellectuals of his age and was a member of many academies (Umoristi, Incogniti, Olimpici, Filarmonici).

Works 

 Castore e Polluce. Rime di Baldassarre Bonifaccio, e di Gio. Maria Vanti, Venice, appresso Francesco Prati, 1618, 12mo;
 Balthassaris Bonifacii Stichidion libri XVIII , Venetiis, apud Pratum, 1619, 16º;
 Bonifacij Musarum pars prima, Venice, apud Ioannem Iacobum Hertium, 1646, 8º;
 Dell'immortalità dell'anima, discorso di Baldassare Bonifaccio, Venice, appresso Antonio Pinelli, 1621, 4º;
 Risposta al manifesto della Signora Sarra Copia, Venice, appresso Antonio Pinelli, 1621;
 Amata: tragedia di Baldassare Bonifaccio , Venice, appresso Antonio Pinelli, 1622, 8º;
 Caroli Sigonii Iudicium de historicis, qui res romanas scripserunt, ab Vrbe condita ad Caroli Magni imperatoris tempora. Accesserunt de eisdem scriptoribus Excerpta a Balthassare Bonifacio, et Ordo Romanæ historiæ legendæ Adriani Politi, Venice, apud Antonium Pinellum, 1627, 4º; Helmstadt, 1674, 4º;
 Historia ludicra. Opus ex omni disciplinarum genere, selecta et Jucunda eruditione refertum, Venice, apud Paulum Baleonium, 1652, 4º; Bruxelles, Joan. Mommartius, 1656;
 De Archivis liber singularis. Ejusdem Praelectiones et Civilium Institutionum Epitome, Venice, Apud J.P. Pinellium, 1632, 4º.
 Balthassaris Bonifacii Conjecturæ in Martialem. Ejusdem Polynesi origines, Venice, ex typographia Pinelliana, 1635.
 Epistolae duae de majoribus Venetorum comitiis et judiciis capitalibus, altera ad Jo. Franciscum Corneanium altera ad Dominicum Molinum. Published by Pieter Burman in the fifth volume of his Thesaurus Antiquitatum et Historiarum Italiae, Lugduni Batavorum, 1722.

References

Bibliography 
 Lester K. Born, Baldassare Bonifacio and his Essay de Archivis, «The American Archivist»,4/4 (1941), p. 221-237
  
 
 
 

17th-century Italian Roman Catholic bishops
Venetian Roman Catholics
1585 births
1659 deaths
17th-century Italian Roman Catholic theologians
17th-century Italian writers
17th-century Italian male writers
Italian historians of religion
People from Crema, Lombardy
Italian archivists